Xinhui, alternately romanized as Sunwui and also known as Kuixiang, is an urban district of Jiangmen in Guangdong, China. It grew from a separate city founded at the confluence of the Tan and West Rivers. It has a population of about 735,500, 98% of whom are Han Chinese but many of whom speak a dialect of Cantonese as their first language. Xinhui is best known in China for its chenpi, a kind of dried Mandarin orange peel.

Geography
Xinhui is situated at the confluence of the Tan and West Rivers in the southwestern area of the Pearl River Delta. It borders the South China Sea and adjoins Macao and Hong Kong. Geologists have shown that Xinhui originated as a shallow bay at the mouth of the Pearl River about 5000 years ago, with its southeastern portion consisting of a chain of islands. The movement of the Tan and West Rivers eventually formed a delta that became the present alluvial plain over the course of the last nine hundred years.

History
Most of the present area of the Xinhui district formed during the historical period from silt deposited by the Tan and West Rivers. Some Neolithic artifacts, however, have been found in the district's territory over the last ten years, including shell mounds and pottery shards.

The former Gugang Prefecture was located in the area.  administered the area of Jiangmen Town before being placed under Jiangmen's administration. It was later promoted to an urban district.

Administration
Xinhui District now forms a part of downtown Jiangmen. It comprises 10 towns, 239 village commissions, 25 community residents' committees, and 4 agencies.

Demographics
Xinhui people are part of the greater Siyi people, in the Greater Siyi Region. Over the last two centuries, more than 600,000 people from Xinhui have migrated overseas (mostly to the Americas, Indonesia, Malaysia, Singapore and Hong Kong), making it one of the largest representative Chinese districts of  overseas Chinese.

Climate

Economy
The paper company Vinda International has its headquarters in the Donghou Industrial Development Zone in Huicheng Town in the district.

Agriculture
Xinhui food exports include rice and fruits, especially oranges. Dried orange peel produced in Xinhui is also used in traditional Chinese cooking.

Dried orange peel produced in Xinhui is world-renowned. It has been used for hundreds years in Chinese cooking and traditional Chinese cooking, adding a pleasant aroma and flavor to food.

Port development

The Yinzhou Lake Economic Area, which is the key development area, is one of the four main economic areas in Jiangmen city. The Tianma port, which is located in Yinzhou Lake inside Yamenkou, is in a strategic location and is in excellent natural condition for port development in the western Pearl River Delta. Tianma port has designated as a regional hub port, similar to the status of Nansha in Shunde, by the governments of Guangdong, Jiangmen and Xinhui. Harbour industries and logistics services will be developed in the surrounding areas of the port.

Attractions
Mount Chishi is a famous scenic spot and tourist destination.

Notable residents

Historical figures
Liang Qichao, known as "The Mind of Modern China", a Chinese scholar, journalist, philosopher, and reformist during the late Qing Dynasty and early Republic of China who inspired Chinese scholars with his writings and reform movements. 
Liang Sicheng He was the son of Liang Qichao, known as "Father of modern Chinese architecture"
Cheong Yoke Choy  – famous and well respected philanthropist during the British Malaya era
 Zhang da nian: historian of mainland China, his publishings included history of anti Japanese occupation of wuyi district,a brief history of xin hui district, etc.  
Chan Heung – Founder of Choy Li Fut one of China's most popular fighting system 
Chan Siu-bak – One of the Four Bandits
Jian Youwen –  Chinese historian, public official, and sometime Methodist pastor,
Jeong Yim is recognized as an important contributor to the expansion of Choy Li Fut 
Leung Long Chau –  is a Chinese poet and calligrapher. Born
Liang Zongdai –  He was one of the most popular "new poets" writing in free verse.
Cheung Po Tsai – Pirate and lover of Ching Shih

Entertainers
Lai Man-Wai -Father of Hong Kong cinema
Andy Lau – famous actor and singer "Nielsen Box Office Star of Asia"
Joey Yung –  She won the prestigious JSG "Most Popular Female Singer" and "Ultimate Best Female Singer – Gold" awards a record breaking eight times, thus emerging as one of the premier Cantonese singers in Hong Kong. Joey is ranked 52nd on the Forbes 2013 Chinese Celebrity List, making her the highest paid Hong Kong-based Cantopop singer with an estimated income of $29,200,000 RMB last year.
Alan Tam – earning the nickname the "Principal" or "Principal Tam" of Hong Kong music industry
Ti Lung –   known for his numerous starring roles in a string of Shaw Brothers Studio's films,
Lau Kar-wing –  Hong Kong martial arts film director, action choreographer and actor.
Kenny Bee – Very famous actor and singer in the 1980s to 1990s
Kenneth Chan –  is a Hong Kong actor and television host for the Hong Kong-based Cable TV Hong Kong channel (previously working for TVB and ATV).
Connie Chan – She made more than 230 films in a variety of genres: from traditional Cantonese opera and wuxia movies to contemporary youth musicals; action films to comedies; melodramas and romances. Owing to her popularity she was dubbed "The Movie-Fan Princess".
Deep Ng –  He is the winner of the 21st annual New Talent Singing Awards Hong Kong Regional Finals. Deep was well received by the viewers since the New Talent Singing Awards in 2002.
Michelle Yim -, Yim won the Best Drama Performance by an Actress Award at the Asian Television Awards 2009 for her role in Moonlight Resonance.
Anthony Chan (actor) –  Hong Kong actor and the drum player for the band Wynners
Tina Leung –  she recognized that she used to gather intelligence for the Chinese Communist Party in the 1960s.
Ha Yu (actor) –  is a Hong Kong actor who has been working on the television network TVB since the 1970s.
Gigi Lai – She is popularly nicknamed by the Hong Kong media as the "Goddess of Beauty"
Gillian Chung -s a Hong Kong singer and actress. She is a member of Cantopop group Twins,
Bondy Chiu – is an actress and singer with Television Broadcasts Limited (TVB)
Leo Fong – Martial arts instructor and filmmaker. Friend and sparring partner of Bruce Lee.

Athletes
Norman Kwong – Lieutenant-Governor of Alberta & professional football player, president & manager of the Calgary Stampeders. He was one of very few of his contemporaries to be voted one of the Canadian Football League's Top 50 players of the sport's modern era by Canadian sports network TSN. 
Darryl O'Young – is a Canadian-bornHong Kong racing driver and Asia champion
Liang Caixia – Chinese modern pentathlete. She finished 29th in the Olympics
Wan Chi Keung –  was a known as "Asia's top striker". Wan was a key player for the Hong Kong national football team in the 1970s and 1980s. Played for South China and Japan club seiko. After retired, he became an actor.
Yu Zhuocheng –  Yu won a silver medal in the 3 metre springboard diving at the 1996 Summer Olympic Games.

Politicians
Chavarat Charnvirakul (陳景鎮) – Thai Chinese politician who served as an Acting Prime Minister of Thailand as a result of the 2008 Thai political crisis.
Fernando Chui – Chief executive of Macau
Yu Hung-Chun – was a Chinese political figure who served as premier of the Republic of China on Taiwan between 1954 and 1958.
Kam Nai-wai – is a member of the Legislative Council of Hong Kong (Geographical constituency, Hong Kong Island). He is a founding member of the Democratic Party, and the member of Central and Western District Council. He currently (as of 2009) works as a social worker and a director of an IT company.
Philip S. Lee – was the 24th Lieutenant Governor of Manitoba.
Wu Tingfang – was a Chinese diplomat and politician who served as Minister of Foreign Affairs and briefly as Acting Premier during the early years of the Republic of China.
Vivienne Poy – She is the first Canadian senator of Asian ancestry. She graduated from St. Paul's Co-educational College, McGill University, Seneca College and the University of Toronto.
Ronny Tong – is a Senior Counsel and also Queen's Counsel and current member of the Legislative Council of Hong Kong (Legco), representing the New Territories East constituency. He is also a member of the Civic Party Executive Committee.
Howard Young – was the member of the Legislative Council of Hong Kong (Functional constituencies, Tourism) and the member of Southern District Council. 
Judy Chu – She is the first Chinese American woman ever elected to the U.S. Congress. Chu was reelected in the 2010 United States midterm elections, defeating Republican challenger Edward "Ed" Schmerling.

Businessmen
Peter Chan (businessman) – a Hong Kong businessman and former Feng shui geomancer to the late Nina Wang, who at the time of her death was the chairperson of Chinachem and Asia's richest woman and local socialite.
Ho Kwon Ping – Chinese Singaporean businessman who is the executive chairman of Banyan Tree Holdings.
Fung Ping-fan – prominent Hong Kong businessman who co-founded the Bank of East Asia. He was also appointed to several political and public service positions.
Lee Hysan –  A rich business man who founded the Hysan Development Company has a market capitalization in excess of HK$20 billion.
Lee Man Tat – one of Hong Kong richest billionaires and chairman of the family-owned Chinese sauce and condiment company Lee Kum Kee, which its products are sold throughout China and many overseas markets.
Lui Che-woo – prominent business magnate, philanthropist and one of Hong Kong richest billionaires. He is the founder and chairman of the listed companies K. Wah International Holdings Ltd. and Galaxy Entertainment Group.
Yip Hon – was a gambling tycoon in South China. His wealth was estimated to be HK$100 million known as " Ghost King "
Engineering

 Yip Yew Seng - President of INCOSE (International Council On Systems Engineering), Singapore Chapter. Singaporean.

Authors
Maxine Hong Kingston – Chinese American author known for writing The Woman Warrior and other books in the genre of Chinese American literature.
Engineering

See also

 Battle of Yamen
 Xinhui People's Hospital

Notes

References

Citations

Bibliography
 , reprinted 2000.
 .

External links

 City of Xinhui official website 

 
Siyi
County-level divisions of Guangdong
Jiangmen